Simuliais a union of Shivalaya Upazila under Manikganj District in Dhaka Division, Bangladesh.

History 
Simulia Union was established in 1918.

Education
 Bajpara High School
 Dhakaijora hazi korban ali memorial institute
 Shakrail high school
 Jomunabad high school

External links

References

Unions of Shivalaya Upazila